Philern Junville Davis (born 11 May 1982) is a British Virgin Islands cricketer. Davis is a right-handed batsman.

In 2006, the British Virgin Islands were invited to take part in the 2006 Stanford 20/20, whose matches held official Twenty20 status. Davis made a single appearance in the tournament against Saint Lucia in a preliminary round defeat, with Davis being run out for a single run by the combination of Garey Mathurin and Mervin Charles.

References

External links
Philern Davis at ESPNcricinfo
Philern Davis at CricketArchive

1982 births
Living people
British Virgin Islands cricketers